Lady Finger bananas (also known as sugar bananas, fig bananas, or date bananas) are diploid cultivars of Musa acuminata. They are small, thin skinned, and sweet.

Taxonomy and nomenclature

The Lady Finger banana is a diploid (AA) cultivar of the seeded banana Musa acuminata. They were once placed under the Sucrier group in the old system of classification.

Its official designation is Musa (AA) 'Lady Finger'.

Synonyms include:
 Musa acuminata Colla (AA Group) cv. 'Sucrier'
 Musa acuminata Colla (Sucrier Group) cv. 'Lady's Finger'
 Musa × paradisiaca  L. cv. 'Lady Finger'
 Musa × paradisiaca L. cultigroup Sucrier cv. 'Doigt de Femme'
 Musa × paradisiaca L. cultigroup Saccharinus cv. 'Lady's Finger'
 Musa × paradisiaca L. cultigroup Saccharinus cv. 'Dedo de Dama'
 Musa acuminata Colla non L. (Sucrier Group) cv. 'Datil'
 Musa acuminata Colla non L. (Sucrier Group) cv. 'Niño'
 Musa acuminata Colla non L. (Sucrier Group) cv. 'Bocadillo'

They are known in English as lady finger bananas, sugar bananas, finger bananas, fig bananas, date bananas, or sucrier. The Malaysian name is pisang mas or, pisang emas. Similarly, in Cambodia, it is referred to as chek pong moan, lit. 'chicken-egg banana', where it is considered the national fruit of Cambodia by royal decree.  In Venezuela, they are known as cambures titiaros.

In Ecuador, this fruit is called "guineo orito" or, simply, "orito".. Besides, several exporters and importers use different commercial names.

In Australia, the name 'lady finger banana' refers to another banana cultivar, the Pachanadan, of the Pome banana sub-group (Musa acuminata × balbisiana Colla (AAB Group) cv. 'Pome'). In Hawaii and the West Indies, 'lady finger' is also used to describe the Ney Poovan banana cultivar (Musa acuminata × balbisiana Colla (AB Group) cv. 'Ney Poovan').

Despite their resemblance, the Lady Finger banana must not be confused with the totally different cultivar Latundan banana which is a bit larger and has a sweet-sour taste. (page 25 of the document or, 11 according to index); or, with Señorita banana, that has a bit larger and pointier end tip. "Señorita" is a word (used as an independent noun; as a title it is written "Srta.") in Spanish used to refer to a single young woman, the correct translation of which is "maiden"; but, if incorrectly translated as "lady", it might make people get confused about these varieties of banana.

Description
Its pseudostem is slender and streaked with reddish brown, but it has a heavy root system that makes it resistant to wind damage. It is resistant to drought and Black Weevil, but is susceptible to Sigatoka. It blooms during mid-summer, late summer, and early fall. It is monocarpic and is propagated asexually.

The skin is thin and the flesh is sweet. 12 to 20 fingers are borne in each hand, with each bunch typically having 10 to 14 hands.

Uses

Lady Finger bananas are eaten fresh or used in desserts. They are known for being sweeter than the common Cavendish-type bananas.

Diseases
Lady Finger are vulnerable to Yellow Sigatoka and resistant to the Panama disease.

See also
 Banana
 Banana cultivar groups
 Musa
 Musa acuminata

References

Banana cultivars